Steve Larrimore (born 14 February 1963) is a Bahamian former professional boxer who competed from 1984 to 2001. As an amateur, he competed at the 1979 Pan American Games, 1982 Central American and Caribbean Games, 1982 Commonwealth Games, the 1983 Pan American Games and at the 1984 Summer Olympics in Los Angeles, losing to eventual bronze medal winner Mirko Puzović of Yugoslavia, and as a professional won the World Boxing Council (WBC) Continental Americas lightweight title, and Commonwealth light welterweight title, and was a challenger for the United States Boxing Association (USBA) lightweight title against Freddie Pendleton, International Boxing Organization (IBO) light welterweight title against Israel Cardona, and National Boxing Association (NBA) Junior Middleweight Title against Hasan Al, his professional fighting weight varied from lightweight to light middleweight.

References

External links

1963 births
Bahamian male boxers
Boxers at the 1979 Pan American Games
Boxers at the 1982 Commonwealth Games
Boxers at the 1983 Pan American Games
Boxers at the 1984 Summer Olympics
Commonwealth Games bronze medallists for the Bahamas
Pan American Games competitors for the Bahamas
Light-middleweight boxers
Lightweight boxers
Light-welterweight boxers
Living people
Olympic boxers of the Bahamas
Sportspeople from Nassau, Bahamas
Welterweight boxers
Commonwealth Games medallists in boxing
Competitors at the 1982 Central American and Caribbean Games
Central American and Caribbean Games bronze medalists for the Bahamas
Central American and Caribbean Games medalists in boxing
Medallists at the 1982 Commonwealth Games